Esiẹ Museum is a museum in Esiẹ, Kwara State, Nigeria. 

The museum was the first to be established in Nigeria when it opened in 1945. The museum once housed over one thousand tombstone figures or images representing human beings. 

It is reputed to have the largest collection of soapstone images in the world. In modern times the Esie museum has been the center of religious activities and hosts a festival in the month of April every year.

References

Museums in Nigeria
Museums established in 1945
Kwara State
20th-century architecture in Nigeria